Kerogan (also Romanized as Kerūgān; also known as Gerūkān, Karūkān, and Kerūkān) is a village in Jasb Rural District, in the Central District of Delijan County, Markazi Province, Iran. At the 2006 census, its population was 182, in 65 families.

References 

Populated places in Delijan County